Bunker Hill Village is a city in Harris County, Texas, United States, part of  metropolitan area. The population was 3,822 at the 2020 census. It is part of a collection of upscale residential communities in west Houston known as the Memorial Villages. As of 2010, Bunker Hill Village was the 6th wealthiest place in Texas. Also, Bunker Hill Village is one of Forbes top 25 places to retire rich.

While Bunker Hill Village is an independent municipality and not part of the City of Houston, the United States Postal Service uses "Houston" for all Bunker Hill Village addresses.

History
Prior to the city's incorporation, German farmers settled the area and built sawmills to process local lumber. A 1936 county highway map states that the area had scattered residences near one of its sawmills.

In the mid-1950s, effort to form a Spring Branch municipality failed. The city incorporated in December 1954 with a mayor-council government. Because of the 1954 incorporation, Houston did not incorporate Bunker Hill Village's territory into its city limits, while Houston annexed surrounding areas that were unincorporated. In 1962 the city had 2,216 people. By 1966 Bunker Hill Village became affluent and had two public schools and two churches. In 1981 4,442 people lived in Bunker Hill Village.

In 2008, Forbes.com selected Bunker Hill Village along with Sugar Land and Hunters Creek Village as one of the three Houston-area "Top Suburbs to Live Well" of Houston.

Geography

Bunker Hill Village is located at  (29.767058, –95.535969).

Demographics

As of the census of 2000, there were 3,654 people, 1,226 households, and 1,085 families residing in the city. The population density was 2,505.1 people per square mile (966.3/km2). There were 1,267 housing units at an average density of 868.6 per square mile (335.1/km2). The racial makeup of the city was 91.49% White, 0.25% African American, 0.08% Native American, 6.46% Asian, 0.03% Pacific Islander, 0.47% from other races, and 1.23% from two or more races. Hispanic or Latino of any race were 3.50% of the population.

There were 1,226 households, out of which 44.4% had children under the age of 18 living with them, 83.5% were married couples living together, 4.1% had a female householder with no husband present, and 11.5% were non-families. 10.5% of all households were made up of individuals, and 7.4% had someone living alone who was 65 years of age or older. The average household size was 2.97 and the average family size was 3.19.

In the city, the population was spread out, with 29.9% under the age of 18, 4.0% from 18 to 24, 17.8% from 25 to 44, 31.9% from 45 to 64, and 16.4% who were 65 years of age or older. The median age was 44 years. For every 100 females, there were 92.8 males. For every 100 females age 18 and over, there were 91.6 males.

The median income for a household in the city was $177,274, and the median income for a family was $200,000. Males had a median income of $100,000 versus $38,214 for females. The per capita income for the city was $86,434. About 2.7% of families and 3.0% of the population were below the poverty line, including 3.1% of those under age 18 and 3.8% of those age 65 or over.

As of the census[1] of 2010, there were 3,542 people and 1,259 households. The racial makeup of the city was 87.7% White, 0.3% African American, 0.1% Native American, 9.7% Asian, 0.06% Pacific Islander, 0.8% from other races, and 1.23% from two or more races. Hispanic or Latino of any race were 5.6% of the population.

As of the 2020 United States census, there were 3,822 people, 1,259 households, and 1,182 families residing in the city.

Government and infrastructure

Bunker Hill Village, Hunters Creek Village, and Piney Point Village jointly operate the Memorial Villages Police Department. The Village Fire Department serves all of the Memorial villages.

Harris County Precinct Three, headed by Steve Radack as of 2008, serves Bunker Hill Village.

Bunker Hill Village is located in District 133 f the Texas House of Representatives. As of 2018 Jim Murphy represents the district. Bunker Hill Village is within District 7 of the Texas Senate; as of 2008 Dan Patrick represents the district.

Bunker Hill Village is in Texas's 7th congressional district; in 2008, the pro-Republican Party publication Human Events identified the zip code 77024 as the zip code that gave the eighth largest contribution to John McCain's 2008 U.S. Presidential Election campaign. The zip code, which includes Hedwig Village, gave $540,309 by October 24, 2008. As of 2019, however, the 7th congressional district is represented by a Democrat, Lizzie Pannill Fletcher.

Like the rest of the Memorial Villages and the similar Park Cities in Dallas, Bunker Hill Village is a very Republican community. Although, like many wealthy places, it swung significantly away from Donald Trump in 2016, the swing was not great enough to overcome the GOP's historical strength there and Trump won by 34 points; reduced to 28 points in 2020.

Bunker Hill Village vote in Presidential elections:

The United States Postal Service location serving 77024 is the Memorial Park Post Office at 10505 Town and Country Way, Houston, Texas, 77024-9998.

Harris Health System (formerly Harris County Hospital District) designated Northwest Health Center for ZIP code 77024. The nearest public hospital is Ben Taub General Hospital in the Texas Medical Center.

Education

Colleges and universities
Spring Branch ISD (and therefore the city of Bunker Hill Village) is served by the Houston Community College System. The Northwest College operates the nearby Town & Country Square Campus in Houston.

Primary and secondary schools

Public schools
Bunker Hill Village is served by Spring Branch Independent School District.

All residents are assigned to Wildcat Way School in Houston for preschool. 

Two elementary schools, Bunker Hill Elementary School and Frostwood Elementary School, are located in the city limits and serve two separate portions of Bunker Hill Village. A small portion is served by Memorial Drive Elementary School in Piney Point Village.

The western portion of Bunker Hill Village is served by Memorial Middle School (in Houston), while the eastern portion is served by Spring Branch Middle School (in Hedwig Village).

All of Bunker Hill Village is served by Memorial High School, which is located in Hedwig Village.

Public libraries 
The Harris County Public Library (HCPL) system operates the Spring Branch Memorial Branch at 930 Corbindale Road in Hedwig Village. The  branch opened in 1975.

Media
The Houston Chronicle is the area regional newspaper.

The Memorial Examiner is a local newspaper distributed in the community.

See also

References

External links
 City of Bunker Hill Village official website

Cities in Texas
Cities in Harris County, Texas
Greater Houston
Populated places established in 1954